The Account of John or Parchment of John is a sacred text of the Latter Day Saint movement, which, according to Latter Day Saint theology, contains a teaching that Jesus gave to his apostles John and Peter, which John wrote down and then hid. Joseph Smith then saw the parchment in vision in April 1829 using his seer stone, and was then able to translate it.

The translation of the parchment of John was one of Smith's earliest written revelations, and along with the Book of Mormon was the earliest of Smith's translation projects. It has been canonized by both the Church of Jesus Christ of Latter-day Saints and Community of Christ in their respective editions of the Doctrine and Covenants.

In the 1835 publication of the translation, the text was significantly expanded. The reasons for the expansion were never explained, leading to broad speculation, ranging from Smith receiving a second revelation on the subject, to Smith or others anachronistically inserting elements to support recent theological developments.

Background
The Gospel of John contains an enigmatic section where Jesus alludes that an anonymous beloved disciple would perhaps live till the second coming. The meaning and identity of this disciple, as well as the authorship of the account has been debated for thousands of years. It was generally believed since around the late second century that the author of the Gospel of John and beloved disciple were both John the son of Zebedee, and this was the consensus in Joseph Smith's time. The current scholarly consensus posits that the book was written by an anonymous author within the Johannine community in the late first century.

The meaning of Jesus' phrase "If I will that he tarry till I come, what is that to thee?" has similarly been broadly interpreted and debated. The scholar Adam Clarke wrote in 1825, "For nearly eighteen hundred years, the greatest men in the world have been puzzled with this passage. It would appear intolerable in me to attempt to decide where so many eminent doctors have disagreed, and do still disagree."

History
In April 1829, Oliver Cowdery had begun to assist as a scribe to Joseph Smith while they were translating the Book of Mormon. During this time a disagreement arose about whether or not the Apostle John had died, or whether he was still alive. The part of the Book of Mormon being translated and events leading up to the disagreement are unknown, however, Frank Judd and Terry Szink suggest that based on the traditional April 7th date of the revelation, that  is a good candidate. In this location of the Book of Mormon narrative, a prophet named Alma leaves the land and is never heard from again, leaving his death ambiguous. Judd and Szink point out that if 3 Nephi 28 were the catalyst, then the traditionally accepted date of the Account of John revelation should be re-examined, as it is unlikely that Smith would have reached that point in the translation by April 7th.

Smith and Cowdery decided to resolve the matter by seeking a revelation from God through the Urim and Thummim. It is not clear whether the Urim and Thummim referred to were the Nephite spectacles buried with the Gold Plates, or seer stone Smith had been using to translate the Book of Mormon. The response was a firsthand narrative by John, with the resurrected Christ informing him that he would indeed tarry until the second coming to bring souls to salvation.

Expansion

The text of the revelation was in flux till 1835, with minor grammatical changes and a significant expansion in 1835.

In 1832, Smith organized what came to be known as First Presidency, composed of a president and two counselors. Smith taught in 1834 that the apostle Peter was the president of the ancient church and was assisted by two counselors, presumed to be James and John. Additionally, in 1834 Oliver Cowdery announced to the church that Peter, James and John had visited Smith and himself and given them the Melchizedek priesthood, which included the keys of church administration. References to Peter, James and John did not appear in any early revelation, but were added to various sections of the Doctrine and Covenants for the 1835 edition including the account of John.

The expansion also draws phrases from Psalm 104:4 and Hebrews 1:7,14, synthesizing the terms "flaming fires," "ministering", and "heirs of salvation".

Reception by Latter Day Saints
The tarrying of John as described in the Account of John, resonated strongly in the early church.

Just a month after the reception of the vision, Smith dictated a section in the Book of Mormon discussing the Three Nephites, disciples of Christ who "desired the thing which John, my beloved, who was with me in my ministry, before that I was lifted up by the Jews, desired of me." They were then granted to live "while the world shall stand." Smith began preaching in public venues that "John the Revelator was then among the ten tribes of israel who had been led away by Salmaneser King of israel, to prepare them for their return, from their Long dispersion, to again possess the land of their father's."

Joseph Smith Sr., the Church's patriarch, gave hundreds of blessings to Latter-day Saints. A recurring theme was a promise similar to John, that the individual would tarry until Christ's return in glory. For example, apostle Orson Pratt was  told that he would "tarry till the Savior comes," and Calvin Beebe was blessed, "Thou hast asked thy God to let thee tarry till the Son of Man comes: and if thou art faithful, and keep all the commandments of the Lord thou shalt have thy desire."

For Latter Day Saints the translation incidentally answers the question of the authorship of the Gospel of John, something that has been debated since at least the 2nd century.

Steven C. Harper suggests that the parchment of John was an original source for the Gospel of John.

Writing in Ensign magazine, Larry E. Dahl of Brigham Young University interprets the canonised account of John as an excerpt from a longer record, suggesting that the full hidden account of John would have included a first-hand account of the Mount of Transfiguration.

References

1829 documents
1829 in Christianity
19th-century Christian texts
Latter Day Saint texts
Works by Joseph Smith
John the Apostle
Works in the style of the King James Version
Doctrine and Covenants